Todd City is an unincorporated community in Anderson County, in the U.S. state of Texas. According to the Handbook of Texas, only 10 people lived in the community in 2000. It is located within the Palestine, Texas micropolitan area.

History
Todd City is thought to be named for a family who lived there in the late 1880s with the same last name. It had a factory, oil tanks, and numerous scattered housing units in the 1930s and 1940s. It also had several scattered homes in 1982 and had only one operating business three years later. Oil production is currently occurring in a nearby oilfield. It had a population of only 10 in 2000.

Geography

Education
Todd City is served by the Neches Independent School District.

References

Unincorporated communities in Anderson County, Texas
Unincorporated communities in Texas